J'aime Crandall (born April 28, 1982) is an American  ballet dancer. She is a principal dancer at Royal Danish Ballet.

Early life and education
Born in Virginia, she grew up in Arizona, and trained in a ballet school in Phoenix. When she was 13, she was admitted to the Kirov Academy of Ballet in Washington, D.C.

Career
In 2001, she joined Universal Ballet in Seoul, South Korea and was promoted to demi-soloist the following year. Her repertoire there where her repertoire included works by Petipa, Balanchine, Brian Yoo and Oleg Vinogradov. In 2003, she became a member of the Dutch National Ballet in Amsterdam. In 2008, she joined the Royal Danish Ballet in Copenhagen as member of the corps de ballet, becoming a soloist in February 2011 and a principal dancer in December the same year. She has danced leading roles in The Sleeping Beauty, Études, La Sylphide and The Nutcracker.

Selected repertoire

 Juliet in Romeo and Juliet
 The Ballerina in Theme and Variations
 Odette/Odile in Swan Lake
 Manon in Manon
 Sylph in La Sylphide
 Manon in Lady of the Camellias
 Tchaikovsky Pas de deux
 Sugar Plum Fairy and Dewdrop in The Nutcracker
 The Ballerina in Etudes
 Aurora in The Sleeping Beauty

 Ballerina in Other Dances
 3rd Movement in Symphony in C
 Nikiya in La Bayadere
 Pas de six in Napoli
 Russian Girl in Serenade
 Pas de deux in Agon
 Mercedes in Don Quixote
 Bella Figura
 Apollo

Source:

References

American ballerinas
Royal Danish Ballet principal dancers
Dutch National Ballet dancers
Prima ballerinas
1982 births
Living people
People from Arizona
21st-century American ballet dancers
Dancers from Arizona
American expatriates in South Korea
American expatriates in the Netherlands
American expatriates in Denmark
21st-century American women